Bazaliivka is a village in Chuhuiv Raion of Kharkiv Oblast in Ukraine, about  east-southeast of the centre of Kharkiv city. It belongs to Chkalovske settlement hromada, one of the hromadas of Ukraine. 

The village came under attack by Russian forces in 2022, during the Russian invasion of Ukraine.

Demographics
Native language distribution as of the Ukrainian Census of 2001:
Ukrainian: 90.32%
Russian: 9.09%
 other languages: 0.59%

References

Villages in Chuhuiv Raion